Beer  is a village in Burao District, in the Togdheer region of Somaliland.

Overview

Drought
Between 1974 and 1975, a major drought referred to as the Abaartii Dabadheer ("The Lingering Drought") occurred in modern-day Somaliland and the neighbouring northern Puntland region of Somalia. The Soviet Union, which at the time maintained strategic relations with the Siad Barre government, airlifted some 90,000 people from the devastated regions of Aynaba and the towns of Beer and Hobyo. New small settlements referred to as Danwadaagaha ("Collective Settlements") were then created in Jubbada Hoose (Lower Jubba) and Jubbada Dhexe (Middle Jubba) regions. The transplanted families were also introduced to farming and fishing techniques, a change from their traditional pastoralist lifestyle of livestock herding.

See also
Administrative divisions of Somaliland
Regions of Somaliland
Districts of Somaliland

References

Populated places in Togdheer